Knyazevka is a rural locality (a village) in Sukkulovsky Selsoviet, Yermekeyevsky District, Bashkortostan, Russia. The population was 59 as of 2010. There is 1 street.

Geography 
Knyazevka is located 25 km north of Yermekeyevo (the district's administrative centre) by road. Bogorodsky is the nearest rural locality.

References 

Rural localities in Yermekeyevsky District